The Lestoideidae are a family of damselflies occurring in South-east Asia, New Guinea and Australia.
The family comprises two genera and nine species.

Genera 
Lestoideidae is an accepted family name and until recently it was considered to be monotypic with only one genus, Lestoidea. However, research over the last twenty years or so has suggested that the genus Diphlebia is also part of Lestoideidae.

The family now includes the following genera:

 Diphlebia  
 Lestoidea 

Note: It is important to distinguish the genus Lestoidea from the superfamily Lestoidea. They have the same spelling, but the superfamily is based on the genus Lestes.

References 

Australian National Insect Collection Database
Lestoideidae - What is a(n) Lestoideidae Encyclopedia.com

 
Damselflies
Odonata families
Odonata of Australia
Endemic fauna of Australia
Taxa named by Philip A. Munz
Insects described in 1919